This is a list of FM radio stations in the United States having call signs beginning with the letters WD through WF. Low-power FM radio stations, those with designations such as WDBA-LP, have not been included in this list.

WD--

WE--

WF--

See also
 North American call sign

FM radio stations in the United States by call sign (initial letters WD-WF)